Vyacheslav Kruglikis a Russian composer and conductor. He is a member of the orchestral conducting faculty at the Saint Petersburg State University of Culture and Arts.

Biography 
Kruglik's one act opera The Carriage was one of three new operas selected by the Mariinsky Theatre for performance in the summer 2009 festival, receiving its premiere at the opera house on 21 June of that year.

Sources

Living people
Russian male classical composers
Russian opera composers
Male opera composers
21st-century Russian conductors (music)
Russian male conductors (music)
21st-century Russian male musicians
Year of birth missing (living people)